Damien Grégorini (born 2 March 1979) is a French former professional footballer who played as a goalkeeper.

External links
 
 

1979 births
Living people
French footballers
France under-21 international footballers
Association football goalkeepers
OGC Nice players
Olympique de Marseille players
AS Nancy Lorraine players
Ligue 1 players
Ligue 2 players
French people of Italian descent